Let's Have a Riot is a 1970 Italian comedy film directed by Luigi Zampa and starring Vittorio Gassman.

Cast
 Vittorio Gassman as Riccardo
 Nino Manfredi as Beretta
 Alberto Sordi as Don Giuseppe
 Enrico Maria Salerno  as Don Roberto
 Michel Simon as Cavazza
 Marina Vlady as Imma
 Milly Vitale as Maria
 Sergio Tofano  as Bishop of Orvieto
 Paola Gassman as TV Presentater 
 Robert Mark as  Piero
 Vittorio Duse as Brigadier Morelli
 Enzo Garinei as The Examiner
 Mariangela Melato 
 Gastone Pescucci

References

External links

1970 films
Italian comedy films
1970s Italian-language films
1970 comedy films
Films directed by Luigi Zampa
Films about clerical celibacy
1970s Italian films